Hexamitoptera is a monotypic moth genus in the family Erebidae. Its only species, Hexamitoptera lawinda, is found in Indonesia (Nias, Sumatra), Peninsular Malaysia and Borneo. The habitat consists of lowland dipterocarp forests. Both the genus and the species were first described by Pagenstecher in 1885.

References

Moths described in 1885
Hypopyrini
Monotypic moth genera